BR-453, also called the Rota do Sol (Route of the Sun) is a federal highway with a length of approximately  that links the east coast of Rio Grande do Sul to the Serra Gaúcha (Gaucho mountain range). The highway starts in Venâncio Aires and ends in Terra de Areia, Rio Grande do Sul.

Work on the highway was started in 1972 and completed in 2008. BR-453 functions as a shortcut to the beaches of Rio Grande do Sul shaving off  from the old route. Before the construction of BR-453, all transit going from the Gaucho Range to the coast had to drive through the capital city of Porto Alegre and go along BR-290 (referred to as "Freeway" in Portuguese).

References

See also 
 Rio Grande do Sul
 Serra Gaúcha
 Polícia Rodoviária Federal

Federal highways in Brazil